The United Counties League in the 1890s was a short lived league between football clubs in the Midlands and Sheffield which ran in addition (and concurrently) to the Football League.

The competition only ran for two seasons, 1893/94 and  1894/95.

The 1893/94 was the only year the competition finished and was won by Derby County. The 1894/95 competition fizzled out as sides failed to complete their fixtures. Nottingham Forest were top of the league that season when the league collapsed.

References

Defunct football leagues in England
United Counties League (1890s)